The Civic Center of Anderson is part of a larger entertainment complex in Anderson, South Carolina, that also features baseball and soccer fields, tennis courts, an amphitheatre, a playground, and conference center. Together, the facility is known as the Anderson Sports and Entertainment Center. Constructed in 1991, the Civic Center itself is used for multiple indoor sports, shows, and concerts, and was host to the 1991-92 Big South Conference men's basketball tournaments. The Clemson Tigers basketball teams played in Anderson in 2002 during the renovation of Littlejohn Coliseum. The capacity of the  building is 6,300.  It served as the home of the Upstate Dragons of the American Arena League in 2018.

The Civic Center of Anderson has hosted Willie Nelson in '91, Athens' Widespread Panic in '93, Hootie in '99, Atlanta's Sevendust in '06, The Wallflowers in '08, Kenny Rogers in '10, and Atlanta's Blackberry Smoke in '22.

References

External links
Official website

College basketball venues in the United States
Sports venues in South Carolina
Indoor arenas in South Carolina
Clemson Tigers basketball venues
Sports venues in Anderson County, South Carolina